The 9th North Carolina Regiment was raised, on 16 September 1776, at Halifax, North Carolina for service with the Continental Army. The regiment saw action at the Battle of Brandywine and Battle of Germantown. The regiment was disbanded, on 1 June 1778, at Valley Forge, Pennsylvania.

History
The 9th North Carolina Regiment was one of ten regiments provided by North Carolina to the Continental Army between September 1775 and November 1776.  It was relatively short lived, having been authorized and established on November 28, 1776 and disbanded by the Continental Congress on June 1, 1778 due to the low number of troops.   It was never reconstituted.

The Hillsborough and Salisbury Districts contributed the bulk of the soldiers in the regiment that assembled in Halifax, North Carolina in the Spring of 1777.  Eight companies of the regiment marched north as part of the Northern Department of the Continental Army and were engaged at the battles of  Brandywine Creek on September 11, 1777 and Germantown on October 4, 1777 (both in Pennsylvania).  All ten regiments from North Carolina participated in both of these battles.  The commandant of the regiment, John Williams, who commissioned as colonel of the regiment on November 26, 1776, returned home to North Carolina after the regiment was disbanded.

The subordination of the 9th North Carolina regiment changed several times during its brief existence:
 November 28, 1776, Southern Department under Brigadier General James Moore, 1st North Carolina Brigade 
 February 5, 1777, Southern Department under Brigadier General JAME Moore, 3rd North Carolina Brigade under Brigadier General Francis Nash
 April 15, 1777, Southern Department under Major General Robert Howe, North Carolina Brigade under Brigadier General Francis Nash
 July 8, 1777, Northern Department under Major General Philip Schuyler, North Carolina Brigade under Brigadier General Francis Nash (under the command of Major General Gilbert du Motier, Marquis de Lafayette at the Battle of Brandwine Creek)
 October 7, 1777, Northern Department under Major General Horatio Gates, North Carolina Brigade under Maj. Gen. Alexander McDougall of New York
 December 20, 1777, Northern Department under Major General Horatio Gates, North Carolina Brigade (North Carolina Line) under Brigadier General Lachlan McIntosh of Georgia
 May 15, 1778, Northern Department under Major General John Stark, North Carolina Brigade (North Carolina Line)
 May 29, 1778, Continental Congress orders reorganization of the ten North Carolina regiments
 June 1, 1778, 9th North Carolina Regiment disbanded

Officers
Field Officers:
 Colonel John Williams, commandant
 Lieutenant Colonel John Luttrell
 Lieutenant Colonel Peter Dauge
 Major William Polk

See also
 North Carolina Line and Engagements for a list of battles and skirmishes of the North Carolina regiments of the Continental Army
 Departments of the Continental Army
 Philadelphia campaign

References

External links
 Bibliography of the Continental Army in North Carolina compiled by the United States Army Center of Military History

North Carolina regiments of the Continental Army
Military units and formations established in 1776
Military units and formations disestablished in 1778
1776 establishments in North Carolina
1778 disestablishments in the United States